This is an incomplete list of 2,700 species of vascular plants which are native to the region of Palestine as defined by Flora Palaestina. Flora Palaestina is a work in four volumes published  by  Brill Academic Publishers between 1966 and 1986,  edited by Michael Zohary and Naomi Feinbrun-Dothan. The region covered includes: the whole area of the State of Israel; the West Bank; the Gaza Strip; the Golan Heights; the Israeli-occupied part of Mount Hermon; and the East Bank, which is in Jordan.

The table below lists alphabetically all species with initial letters C–D. For other species, click here:
A–B
E–O
P–Z

References

Bibliography

 02
Palestine02
Plants02